The Victor Talking Machine Company was an American recording company and phonograph manufacturer that operated independently from 1901 until 1929, when it was acquired by the  Radio Corporation of America and subsequently operated as a subsidiary called RCA Victor.

Headquartered in Camden, New Jersey, it was the largest and most prestigious firm of its kind in the world, probably best known for its use of the iconic "His Master's Voice" trademark and the production, marketing, and design of the popular "Victrola" line of phonographs. After its merger with RCA in 1929, the company continued to make phonographs, records, radios and other products.

History 
In 1896, Emile Berliner—inventor of the gramophone and disc record—contracted machinist Eldridge R. Johnson to manufacture his inventions.

Name 
There are different accounts as to how the "Victor" name came about. RCA historian Fred Barnum gives various possible origins of the name in "His Master's Voice" In America, he writes, "One story claims that Johnson considered his first improved Gramophone to be both a scientific and business 'victory.' A second account is that Johnson emerged as the 'Victor' from the lengthy and costly patent litigations involving Berliner and Frank Seaman's Zonophone. A third story is that Johnson's partner, Leon Douglass, derived the word from his wife's name 'Victoria.' Finally, a fourth story is that Johnson took the name from the popular 'Victor' bicycle, which he had admired for its superior engineering. Of these four accounts, the first two are the most generally accepted."  The first use of the Victor title on a letterhead, on March 28, 1901, nine weeks after the death of British Queen Victoria.

Marketing 

Herbert Rose Barraud's deceased brother, a London photographer, willed him his estate, including his DC-powered Edison-Bell cylinder phonograph with a case of cylinders and his dog Nipper. Barraud's original painting depicts Nipper staring intently into the horn of an Edison-Bell while both sit on a polished wooden surface. The horn on the Edison-Bell machine was black and after a failed attempt at selling the painting to a cylinder record supplier of Edison Phonographs in the UK, a friend of Barraud's suggested that the painting could be brightened up (and possibly made more marketable) by substituting one of the brass-belled horns on display in the window at the new gramophone shop on Maiden Lane. The Gramophone Company in London was founded and managed by an American, William Barry Owen.  Barraud paid a visit with a photograph of the painting and asked to borrow a horn. Owen gave Barraud an entire gramophone and asked him to paint it into the picture, offering to buy the result. On close inspection, the original painting still shows the contours of the Edison-Bell phonograph beneath the paint of the gramophone.

In 1915, the "His Master's Voice" logo was rendered in immense circular leaded-glass windows in the tower of the Victrola cabinet building at Victor's headquarters in Camden, New Jersey. The building still stands today with replica windows installed during RCA's ownership of the plant in its later years. Today, one of the original windows is located at the Smithsonian museum in Washington, D.C.

Acoustical recording era (1901–1925) 

In the company's early years, Victor issued recordings on the Victor, Monarch and De Luxe labels, with the Victor label on 7-inch records, Monarch on 10-inch records and De Luxe on 12-inch records. De Luxe Special 14-inch records were briefly marketed in 1903–1904. In 1905, all labels and sizes were consolidated into the Victor imprint.

The first jazz and blues records ever issued were recorded by the Victor Talking Machine Company. The Victor Military Band recorded the first recorded blues song, "The Memphis Blues", on July 15, 1914, in Camden, New Jersey. In 1917, The Original Dixieland Jazz Band recorded "Livery Stable Blues".

Electrical recording era (1925–present) 

The advent of radio as a home entertainment medium in the early 1920s presented Victor and the entire record industry with new challenges. Not only was music becoming available over the air free of charge, but a live broadcast made using a high-quality microphone and heard over a high-quality receiver provided clearer, more "natural" sound than a contemporary record. After much resistance from executives in Victor's highest echelons, the company switched from the acoustical or mechanical method of recording to the new microphone-based electrical system developed by Western Electric in 1925. Victor called its version of the improved fidelity recording process "Orthophonic", and sold a new line of phonographs called "Orthophonic Victrolas", scientifically designed by Western Electric to play these new records. Victor's first electrical recordings, issued in early 1925 were not advertised as such; in order to create an extensive catalog of the new records to satisfy anticipated demand, and to allow dealers time to liquidate their stocks of old-style Victrolas, Victor and its longtime rival, Columbia Records, agreed to keep electrical recording secret until the autumn of 1925. Then, with the company's largest advertising campaign to date, Victor publicly announced the new technology and introduced its new records and the Orthophonic Victrolas on November 2, 1925, dubbed "Victor Day".

Victor's first commercial electrical recording was made at the company's Camden, New Jersey studios on February 26, 1925. A group of eight popular Victor artists, Billy Murray, Frank Banta, Henry Burr, Albert Campbell, Frank Croxton, John Meyer, Monroe Silver, and Rudy Wiedoeft gathered to record "A Miniature Concert". Several takes were recorded by the old acoustical process, then additional takes were recorded electrically for test purposes. The electrical recordings turned out well, and Victor issued the results that summer as the two sides of twelve inch 78 rpm disc, Victor 35753. Victor's first electrical recording to be issued was Victor 19626, a ten-inch record consisting of two numbers recorded on March 16, 1925, from the University of Pennsylvania's thirty-seventh annual production of the Mask and Wig Club, issued in April, 1925. On March 21, 1925, Victor recorded its first electrical Red Seal disc, twelve inch 6502 by pianist Alfred Cortot, of works by Chopin and Schubert.

Post-acquisition (1929–present) 
In 1926, Johnson sold his controlling (but not holding) interest in the Victor Company  to the banking firms of JW Seligman and Speyer & Co., who in turn sold Victor to the Radio Corporation of America in 1929.

List of Victor Records artists

Archives
The Discography of American Historical Recordings (DAHR) is a continuation of the Encyclopedic Discography of Victor Recordings (EDVR) project by Ted Fagan and William Moran to make a complete discography of all Victor recordings as well as adding the recordings of Columbia, Brunswick and other historic American labels now controlled by Sony Music Entertainment.  The Victor archive files are a major source of information for this project.

In 2011, the Library of Congress and Victor catalog owner Sony Music Entertainment launched the National Jukebox offering streaming audio of more than 10,000 pre-1925 recorded works for listening by the general public; the majority of these recordings have not been widely available for over 100 years.

See also
 RCA Records
 RCA Red Seal
 RCA Victrola
 RCA Camden
 His Master's Voice
 Grammy Award
 List of phonograph manufacturers

Further reading
 Bryan, Martin F. Report to the Phonothèque Québécoise on the Search for Archival Documents of Berliner Gram-O-Phone Co., Victor Talking Machine Co., R.C.A. Victor Co. (Montréal), 1899–1972. Further augmented ed. Montréal: Phonothèque Québécoise, 1994. 19, [1] p.

References

External links

 Victor masters in the Discography of American Historical Recordings
 "Victrola Credenza" at Victor-Victrola page
 "Identifying Victor Products" at Victor-Victrola page
 Victor timeline at the David Sarnoff Library
 RCA Corporation records at Hagley Museum and Library  (1887–1983) About the history of RCA and Victor
 RCA Corporation photos at Hagley Museum (1878–1960)
 Victor Records on the Internet Archive's Great 78 Project
 Instructions for the setting up, operation & care of The Victrola, Spring Type, Victor Talking Machine Company, Camden, NJ., c. 1924. (from ''The Roaring 20's Victrola page)

American record labels
Jazz record labels
Record labels established in 1901
Record labels disestablished in 1929
Defunct companies based in New Jersey
Former components of the Dow Jones Industrial Average
Companies based in Camden, New Jersey

Mass media in Camden, New Jersey